The World Digital Song Sales chart (formerly World Digital Songs) is a weekly record chart compiled by Nielsen SoundScan and published by Billboard magazine. Established in 2010—with the issue dated January 23—as one of 21 genre-specific song charts launched by Billboard that year, it originally ranked the 25 best-selling digital singles in the World Music genre, but has since been reduced to 15 entries, effective the issue dated November 20, 2021.

Hawaiian singer-songwriter and musician Israel Kamakawiwoʻole's recording of "Somewhere Over the Rainbow" was the first song to rank at number one on the chart. It has dominated the ranking for most of its existence, spending 358 cumulative weeks at the top, including a 116-week run at number one from the chart's inception until April 2012. The song has appeared on 687 issues of the chart, excluding one issue for the week dated June 25, 2022. Another notable chart-topper is Psy's "Gangnam Style", which stands in second place for most weeks at number one with a total of 50 weeks between 2012 and 2014, and for total weeks on the chart, with 381. Over the years, many other K-pop artists have appeared on the chart, with some reaching the top position. BTS, who earned their first number-one on the chart with "Fire" in 2016, have achieved a record 33 number-one singles. Blackpink has accumulated nine number-one singles, the most of any female artist on the chart.

The current number-one song on the chart, as of the issue dated March 18, 2023, is "Calm Down" by Rema featuring Selena Gomez.

List of number-one songs

Song milestones

Most weeks at number one

Most total weeks on the World Digital Song Sales chart

Artist achievements

Most number-one singles

Most cumulative weeks at number one (all songs)

Number one debuts

Most number-one debuts

Other select World Digital Song Sales chart achievements
 BTS is the only act to simultaneously occupy the chart's top-15 spots on three separate occasions. The group did so on the issues dated September 8, 2018, with songs from Love Yourself: Answer; March 7, 2020, with songs from Map of the Soul: 7; and June 25, 2022, with songs from Proof.
 Blackpink tied with Psy and Big Bang for the second-most number-one singles of any act on the chart in 2018, when they earned their fourth number-one with "Ddu-Du Ddu-Du". The girl group claimed the second-place record the following year when they earned their fifth number-one single with "Kill This Love", which rose to the top of the chart on the issue dated April 20, 2019. 
 Wizkid, Burna Boy, Mr Eazi, and Tems are the only Nigerian artists to reach number one on the chart. Of the four, Wizkid, Mr. Eazi, and Tems are the only artists to debut in the lead position. Wizkid was the first to do so, debuting atop the chart in November 2018 as a featured artist on the song "Checklist" by Normani and Calvin Harris. Mr Eazi earned his number-one debut in 2020 with the Major Lazer collaboration single "Oh My Gawd" featuring Nicki Minaj and K4mo. Tems debuted at number one in August 2022, with her cover of "No Woman, No Cry" from the Wakanda Forever Prologue extended play.
 Hwasa is the first female K-pop soloist to have two songs simultaneously enter the top-10 of the chart. Her songs "I'm a B" and "Bless U" debuted at numbers 7 and 10 respectively on the issue dated December 4, 2021.
 Agust D, J-Hope, and Jin are the only solo artists in the history of the chart to simultaneously occupy the top three positions. Agust D did it with "Daechwita", "Strange", and "Burn It" on the chart issue dated June 6, 2020; J-Hope did it with "Arson", "= (Equal Sign)", and "Safety Zone" on the chart issue dated July 30, 2022; and Jin did it with "Super Tuna", "Abyss", and "Tonight" on the chart issue dated November 5, 2022.

Notes

References

External links 
 Current World Digital Song Sales chart

2010 establishments in the United States
2010 introductions
2010 in music
Billboard charts
World music songs